Fred Theobald (born 19 June 1950) is a German wrestler. He competed in the men's Greco-Roman 90 kg at the 1976 Summer Olympics.

References

External links
 

1950 births
Living people
German male sport wrestlers
Olympic wrestlers of West Germany
Wrestlers at the 1976 Summer Olympics
People from Pirmasens
Sportspeople from Rhineland-Palatinate